Hamji High School is a high school located in Daegu in Korea. The school's emblem tree is a pine and emblem flower a rose. This school is science-orientated and offers a curriculum specializing in science subjects.

History 
Important dates pertaining to the history of the school include:

8 November 2005: Plans to establish Hamji High School were confirmed.
16 August 2006: Construction of the school commenced.
10 February 2008: Construction of the school was completed.
1 March 1, 2008: The school's first principal took office.
3 March 3, 2008: The first entrance ceremony was held.

References 
Hamji High School website

Educational institutions established in 2008
High schools in Daegu
2008 establishments in South Korea